Michael L. Brown (born March 16, 1955) is an American radio host, author, apologist, activist, and proponent of Messianic Judaism, Christian Zionism, and the Charismatic Movement. His nationally syndicated radio show, The Line of Fire, airs throughout the United States. He contributes articles to the Christian news platform The Stream as well as to the news site Townhall, and serves as head of the Coalition of Conscience, a Christian organization in the Charlotte, North Carolina area. He holds a Ph.D in Near Eastern Languages and Literature from New York University.

Career

Academic 
Michael L. Brown (PhD, New York University) is president and professor of practical theology at FIRE School of Ministry in Concord, NC. He has also served as visiting professor of Old Testament at Trinity Evangelical Divinity School in Deerfield, Illinois and visiting professor of Jewish apologetics at Fuller Theological Seminary, School of World Mission as well as several other seminaries.

His own organizations 
Between 1996 and 2000 he was one of the leaders in the Brownsville Revival, a Christian revolution movement that began on June 18, 1995, at the Brownsville Assembly of God church in Pensacola, Florida. In 2000, though, the board removed him from the movement.

In 2001 he started the FIRE School of Ministry, a Christian leadership training institute that is heavily influenced by the revival movement that Brown was removed from. In 2005 Brown founded another revivalist organization called ICN Ministries. The intent of the organization is to spread the revivalist message to places like Israel, other Christian organizations, and other places where Brown has influence.

Controversy 

In the past Brown has been criticized in Charlotte by the local LGBTQ community for holding a rally in protest of their 2009 Charlotte Pride Festival. The Southern Poverty Law Center has profiled him for his promotion of "junk science" on topics connected to sexual orientation, such as in his regular claims that, rather than being genetic, homosexuality is caused by childhood trauma, as well as his support for conversion therapy. In September 2012, the organization named him in their list of "30 New Activists Heading Up the Radical Right." In March 2014, Brown traveled to Peru to oppose the legalization of gay marriage there. He has also defended Uganda's criminalization of homosexuality. He has said gay people should be treated with respect and dignity.

Brown was criticized for citing the white supremacist website Stormfront in an article "asking whether it was time for another Jesus Movement among Jewish millennials". He apologized, saying he was not aware what the site was.

Publications 
Jezebel's War With America (2019) 
Hyper-Grace : Exposing the Dangers of the Modern Grace Message (2014) 
The Real Kosher Jesus: Revealing the Mysteries of the Hidden Messiah (2012) 
60 Questions Christians Ask About Jewish Beliefs and Practices (2011) 
A Queer Thing Happened to America: And What a Long, Strange Trip It's Been (2011) 
 
 
 
 
 
 
It's Time to Rock the Boat (1993) 
How Saved Are We? (1990) 
Go And Sin No More: A Call To Holiness (1999) 
Israel's Divine Healer (1995) 
A Time For Holy Fire: Preparing the Way for Divine Visitation (2008) 
What Do Jewish People Think about Jesus?: And Other Questions Christians Ask about Jewish Beliefs, Practices, and History (2007) 
The Revival Answer Book (2001) 
The End of the American Gospel Enterprise (1993) 
Revolution!: The Call to Holy War (2000) 
Let No One Deceive You (1997) 
Our Hands Are Stained with Blood (1992) 
Can You Be Gay and Christian?: Responding With Love and Truth to Questions About Homosexuality (2014) 
Authentic Fire: A Response to John MacArthur's Strange Fire (2015)

With others 
Jeremiah--Ezekiel (The Expositor's Bible Commentary) (2010) with Tremper Longman III, David E. Garland, Paul Ferris Jr. 
Tree of Life Version (2014) with Jeffrey Seif et al. 
Breaking the Stronghold of Food: How We Conquered Food Addictions and Discovered a New Way of Living (2017) With his wife Nancy Brown

Contributions 
Oxford Dictionary of Jewish Religion 
Theological Dictionary of the Old Testament.

Videos

Channel 
ASKDrBrown - Youtube channel

Debates

References

External links 
   Retrieved 2019-01-05.
 
 
 

1955 births
Living people
American biblical scholars
American spiritual teachers
American television evangelists
Editors of Christian publications
Messianic Jews
New York University alumni
Old Testament scholars
Radio personalities from North Carolina
Writers from Charlotte, North Carolina
Bible commentators
Writers on antisemitism
American Christian Zionists
Writers on Zionism